Ziad Ali Al Samad (born 6 August 1978) is a Lebanese professional football coach and former player who is the goalkeeper coach of  club Ansar and the Lebanon national under-23 team. As a player, Al Samad played as a goalkeeper.

With 47 caps for the Lebanon national team, Al Samad is his country’s all-time most capped goalkeeper.

Club career 
Al Samad started his senior club career at Lebanese Premier League club Riada Wal Adab, before moving to Ansar during the 1999–2000 season. In his first season at the club, Al Samad won both the Lebanese Federation Cup, and the Lebanese Super Cup. The following season, in 2000–01, Al Samad helped Ansar win both the Lebanese Elite Cup, and the Federation Cup. In 2001–02, Al Samad won the Lebanese FA Cup, before helping Ansar winning two domestic doubles (league and cup) in a row, in 2005–06 and 2006–07.

In 2008, Al Samad moved to Racing Beirut, staying there for three seasons season. In 2011 he moved to 2008 AFC Cup runners-up Safa. In his three seasons at the club, Al Samad would help Safa win two league titles (2011–12, 2012–13), an FA Cup (2012–13), another Elite Cup (2012), and a Super Cup (2013).

On 30 September 2014, Safa sold Al Samad to Bahraini side Saham on a one-season deal. Following the 2014–15 Oman Professional League season, Al Samad retired from football.

International career 
Al Samad made his senior international debut for Lebanon on 1 September 2002 at the 2002 WAFF Championship, against Jordan; Lebanon lost 1–0. The goalkeeper's first clean sheet came on 26 December 2002, at the 2002 Arab Nations Cup, in a goalless draw against Bahrain.

Al Samad ended his international career with 47 caps for the Lebanon national team, as his country’s all-time most capped goalkeeper.

Managerial career 
On 12 August 2020, Al Samad was appointed goalkeeper coach of the Lebanon national under-23 team. He became goalkeeper coach of Lebanese Premier League side AC Sporting on 18 June 2021. On 27 September 2021, following Jamal Taha's appointment as head coach, Al Samad was confirmed goalkeeper coach of Lebanon U23. On 28 June 2022, he was appointed goalkeeper coach of Ansar.

Honours
Ansar
 Lebanese Premier League: 2005–06, 2006–07
 Lebanese FA Cup: 2001–02, 2005–06, 2006–07
 Lebanese Elite Cup: 2000
 Lebanese Federation Cup: 1999, 2000
 Lebanese Super Cup: 1999

Safa
 Lebanese Premier League: 2011–12, 2012–13
 Lebanese FA Cup: 2012–13
 Lebanese Elite Cup: 2012
 Lebanese Super Cup: 2013

Individual
 Lebanese Premier League Team of the Season: 2002–03, 2003–04, 2004–05, 2011–12, 2012–13

See also
 List of Lebanon international footballers
 List of Lebanon international footballers born outside Lebanon

References

External links
 
 Ziad Al Samad at RSSSF
 
 

1978 births
Living people
Lebanese footballers
Association football goalkeepers
Riada Wal Adab Club players
Al Ansar FC players
Racing Club Beirut players
Safa SC players
Saham SC players
Lebanese Premier League players
Oman Professional League players
Lebanon international footballers
Lebanese expatriate footballers
Lebanese expatriate sportspeople in Oman
Expatriate footballers in Oman
Association football goalkeeping coaches